Microcolona technographa is a moth in the family Elachistidae. It is found in north-eastern India.

The wingspan is about 10 mm. The forewings are brownish-fuscous, with a slender blackish-grey streak along the basal third of the costa, interrupted in the middle by a whitish dot. A blotch of whitish suffusion occupies the dorsal half from the base to one-third and there is a whitish oval ring in the disc slightly before the middle, from which a slender blackish-grey streak extends to the end of the cell. There is also a dark elongate blotch along the posterior half of the dorsum, anteriorly with a large tuft and edged by whitish suffusion. There is an oblique whitish strigula from the costa beyond the middle and a dark grey rounded or transverse blotch resting on the middle of the termen, edged above by an oblique white line. There is also a blackish-grey blotch crossing the wing just before the apex. The hindwings are dark grey with a pale or whitish base.

The larvae feed on Psidium guajava. They bore in the tender shoots of their host plant and pupate within the feeding tunnel.

References

Moths described in 1928
Microcolona
Moths of Asia